The PolyIran study is a pragmatic open-labeled randomized trial being conducted within Golestan cohort study (GCS) on 31000 subjects in 305 villages of Golestan Province,  northeastern Iran. The pill used in this study namely "Polypill", has been successfully evaluated in a pilot study and consists of 4 components. It is estimated to decrease the death rate due to myocardial infarction and stroke by 30-53% . Participants were enrolled in the study during February 2011 and April 2013.  The study will directly evaluate the effect of Polypill tablets on cardiovascular death and hospitalizations compared to lifestyle modification during 5 years of follow-up; unlike most of the studies that only investigate the impact of Polypill on indirect surrogate markers of cardiovascular diseases such as blood pressure or lipid profile. The study includes three arms. The first and largest arm (24000 subjects) are being just followed and receive no particular care other than care provided by the governmental health system in Iran (usual care arm). The second arm (3500 subjects) receive recommendations about a healthy lifestyle in face-to-face interviews and pamphlets, undergo blood pressure measurements in 6 months regular intervals, and are referred to secondary or tertiary medical centers for treatment upon necessity(minimal care arm). The third arm (another 3500 subjects)  receive Polypill once daily in addition to the care provided to the minimal care arm (Polypill arm) . In case of a substantial decrease in mortality in Polypill arm at the end of the study, Polypill might be offered to all individuals above 50 years old as a cheap preventive alternative for cardiovascular diseases .

References

Healthcare in Iran
Clinical trials related to cardiology